Sir Henry Osmond Osmond-Clarke (also known as Nobby Clarke)  (8 February 1905 - 24 October 1986) was a British orthopaedic surgeon.

He was born at Brookeborough, County Fermanagh and trained at Trinity College, Dublin. He was appointed in a consultant in 1936 at Crumpsall Hospital, the same year he was elected Hunterian Professor. and later at the Royal National Orthopaedic Hospital.  He was a visiting surgeon at the Robert Jones and Agnes Hunt Hospital for more than 40 years.

He was a member of the Council of the Royal College of Surgeons from 1959 to 1975 and Orthopaedic Surgeon to the Queen from 1965 to 1973.

He was appointed Knight Commander of the Royal Victorian Order in the 1969 New Year Honours.

References

Knights Commander of the Royal Victorian Order
Irish orthopaedic surgeons
1905 births
1986 deaths
20th-century surgeons